Revesby can mean the following places :-

Revesby, New South Wales, a suburb in the City of Bankstown, Australia
Revesby, Lincolnshire, a civil parish in the East Lindsey district of Lincolnshire, England
Revesby Abbey, a Cistercian monastery located near the village